Ghumurishi Church of St. John the Baptist is a 19th-century Eastern Orthodox church on left bank of Okumi river in the village of Zemo Ghumurishi, north of the town of Gali, in Abkhazia, an entity in the South Caucasus with a disputed political status. The locale is part of the historical district of Samurzakano. Not to be confused with Ghumurishi Sagergaio Church built in  first half of the 11th century and rebuilt in the 19th century in the same village.

History 
The church is a hall-church design, built from 1888 to 1889. It is built of coarsely cut rubble stone and white rectangular limestone slabs. The floor was also once faced with similar slabs, but only its portion survives at the sanctuary. A belfry, now in ruins, is attached to the west wall of the church. The apse is covered with a simple dome-like roof and is pierced with three arched windows. A pair of similar windows is found each, on the southern and northern walls. Some 3 km northwest of the village are the ruins of a medieval site of Christian worship known as Sagergaio

References 

Churches in Abkhazia
Abkhazian Orthodox churches
Immovable Cultural Monuments of National Significance of Georgia